Katekalyan is a Tehsil and Development Block of District Dakshin Bastar, Dantewada, Chhattisgarh.

Cities and towns in Dantewada district
Tehsils of Chhattisgarh